
Gmina Łęczna is an urban-rural gmina (administrative district) in Łęczna County, Lublin Voivodeship, in eastern Poland.

Villages
Apart from the town of Łęczna, Gmina Łęczna contains the villages and settlements of Ciechanki Krzesimowskie, Ciechanki Łęczyńskie, Karolin, Leopoldów, Łuszczów-Kolonia, Nowogród, Piotrówek Drugi, Podzamcze, Rossosz, Stara Wieś, Stara Wieś-Kolonia, Stara Wieś-Stasin, Trębaczów, Witaniów, Zakrzów and Zofiówka.

Neighbouring gminas
Gmina Łęczna is bordered by the gminas of Ludwin, Mełgiew, Milejów, Puchaczów, Spiczyn and Wólka.

References

Polish official population figures 2006

Leczna
Łęczna County